Pinecliff is a nonprofit maintenance corporation in Yakima County, Washington, United States, located approximately 20 miles west of Ellensburg, adjacent to the Naches River.

References

Unincorporated communities in Yakima County, Washington
Unincorporated communities in Washington (state)